Dăbuleni is a town of Dolj County, Oltenia, Romania. It was declared a town in 2004 (Law no. 83/2004). One village, Chiașu, is administered by the town.

Dăbuleni is known for the sandy areas surrounding it; since the 1980s, those areas have become part of an  desert, known as the Oltenian Sahara. The town is the only place in Europe where a museum dedicated to sand exists.

Dăbuleni is twinned since 2014 with Vaugneray, which is in France.

Irrigation near Dăbuleni
With water pumped from the Danube, an irrigation scheme was developed during 1971 to 1975 for some 100 square kilometres of fertile land in southern Oltenia.

Culture

Sand Museum of Dăbuleni
Its entrance is free and it is often visited by researchers and common people. Romania has been claimed to be the only country with a museum dedicated to sand in Europe or even the world.

References

Towns in Romania
Populated places in Dolj County
Localities in Oltenia